

This is a list of the Albania women's national football team results from its formation in 2011 to the present day.

2011

2012

2013

2014

2015

2016

2017

2018

2019

Record against other nations

References

2010s in Albania
2010s